The IMOCA 60 class yacht Ecover 2, GBR 3 was designed by Owen Clark Design and launched in 2003 after being made by Southern Ocean Marine in New Zealqnd.

Racing results

References 

2000s sailing yachts
Sailing yachts designed by Owen Clarke Design
Sailing yachts designed by Merfyn Owen
Sailing yachts designed by Allen Clarke
Vendée Globe boats
IMOCA 60
Sailboat types built in New Zealand
Southern Ocean Marine